Hannah is an Australian pop singer, songwriter and musician.

Biography 
Her debut single, "No Relief" was released in April 2002 and entered the ARIA Singles Chart at #40. But it was reported her mother helped buy her into the Australian top 40 after her mother encouraged friends and family to buy multiple copies in a bid to push her to the charts. After this was discovered, many sales were removed by ARIA's chart compilers. 

Her follow-up single was "Stop n Think" in November 2002. Both singles peaked at #18 on the singles chart.

Discography

Singles

References

1978 births
Living people
Australian women pop singers
Australian women singer-songwriters
21st-century Australian singers
21st-century Australian women singers